Siamak Shayeghi (11 August 1954 – 15 April 2020) was an Iranian film director and film producer.

Born in Abadan, he graduated in Cinema and Television and started his career as film critic and was assistant director in the mid-1980s. In 1990 and 1991 he worked together with the famous Iranian opera singer and film actor Hossein Sarshar.

Filmography
 A Dowry for Robab, 1987
 Star and Diamond, 1988
 Renault - Tehran 29, 1990
 Rah o birah, 1991 
 Maze, 1992
 In Cold Blood, 1994
 My Mother Gissou, 1995
 Sharareh, 1999
 Bāgh-e Ferdows, 5 O'clock in the afternoon, 2005
 Khab e Zemestani, 2008

References

External links

1954 births
2020 deaths
Iranian film directors
Iranian film producers
People from Abadan, Iran